Major chess events that took place in 2018 included the Candidates Tournament, won by Fabiano Caruana, who earned the right to challenge Magnus Carlsen in the World Chess Championship 2018. Magnus Carlsen won the match on tiebreaks and retained the title of World Chess Champion. There were two Women's World Chess Championship events; the first a match held in May between Ju Wenjun and Tan Zhongyi, won by Ju Wenjun, and the second, held in November, a 64-player knockout tournament where Ju Wenjun defended her title.

2018 tournaments 
This is a list of 15 significant 2018 chess tournaments:

Transfer

Deaths

 Robert Abbott (2 March 1933 – 20 February 2018), American game designer and chess variant creator.
 Peggy Clarke (29 October 1937 – 15 September 2018), British Women's Champion in 1966.
 Roberto Luis Debarnot (5 August 1947 – 25 May 2018), Argentine International Master and three-time Olympian.
 Győző Forintos (30 July 1935 – 5 December 2018), Hungarian Grandmaster, chess writer and six-time Olympian.
 Giam Choo Kwee (7 May 1942 – 13 August 2018), Singaporean International Master, four-time Olympian, and two-time Singapore Chess Champion.
 Ruth Haring (23 January 1955 – 29 November 2018), American chess Woman International Master and five-time Olympian.
 Nino Khurtsidze (28 September 1975 – 22 April 2018), Georgian International Master and Woman Grandmaster, five-time Olympian, Georgian Champion in 1998, and five-time Georgian Women's Champion.
 Stefán Kristjánsson (8 December 1982 – 28 February 2018), Icelandic Grandmaster and five-time Olympian.
 Aloyzas Kveinys (9 July 1962 – 26 July 2018), Lithuanian Grandmaster and eight-time Olympian.
 Milunka Lazarević (1 December 1932 – 15 December 2018), Serbian chess player and journalist.
 Anatoly Lein (28 March 1931 – 1 March 2018), Soviet and American Grandmaster.
 Erwin Nievergelt (29 April 1929 – 4 August 2018), Swiss Olympian in 1954 and 1958.
 Eric Schiller (20 March 1955 – 3 November 2018), American FIDE Master and chess author.
 Philip Short  (15 May 1960 – 31 August 2018), Irish FIDE Master and five-time Irish Champion.
 Evgeni Vasiukov (5 March 1933 – 10 May 2018), Soviet Grandmaster and 1995 World Senior Champion.

References 

 
21st century in chess
Chess by year
2018 sport-related lists